Yury Morozov (born  1949), is the former Prime Minister of South Ossetia.

Yury Morozov may also refer to:

 Yuri Morozov (ice hockey) (born 1938), Soviet ice hockey player
 Yury Morozov (footballer, born 1934) (1934–2005), Russian football coach
 Yury Morozov (footballer, born 1985), Russian football player
 Yuri Morozov (musician) (1948–2006), Russian musician